Netherby is an inner-southern suburb of Adelaide, South Australia which lies within the City of Mitcham. It is bordered by the suburbs of Springfield, Kingswood, Mitcham and Malvern.

Netherby is located within walking distance of Mitcham Square Shopping Centre and sports facilities.

Schools 

Unley High School and Urrbrae Agricultural High School are located within the suburb.
The suburb is in close proximity to Mercedes College and Scotch College as well as St Josephs and Mitcham Primary schools and Mitcham Girls School.

Governance 

Netherby is located in the federal electorate of Boothby, and has been represented since 2016 by Nicolle Flint of the Liberal Party of Australia. This seat has been held by the Liberal party since 1948: John McLeay, Sr. (1949–1966), John McLeay, Jr. (1966–1981) and Steele Hall (1981–1996).

At the state level it is in the electorate of Waite, which has been Liberal-held since the first election was held for it in 1993. The incumbent member is Sam Duluk.

During the 2020 electoral district redistribution  Netherby was transferred to the Electorate of Unley.

The local council of Netherby is the Mitcham Council.

References

Suburbs of Adelaide